RAB44, member RAS oncogene family is a protein that in humans is encoded by the RAB44 gene.

References

Further reading